Kinistino is a town in Saskatchewan, Canada.

Kinistino may also refer to:

Rural Municipality of Kinistino No. 459, rural municipality of Saskatchewan
Kinistino (Saskatchewan provincial electoral district), former Saskatchewan provincial electoral district
Kinistino (N.W.T. electoral district), former Northwest Territories territorial electoral district

See also 
Melfort (provincial electoral district), former Saskatchewan provincial electoral district known as Melfort-Kinistino from 1971 to 1975